Polypeptide N-acetylgalactosaminyltransferase 1 is an enzyme that in humans is encoded by the GALNT1 gene.

This gene encodes a member of the UDP-N-acetyl-alpha-D-galactosamine:polypeptide N-acetylgalactosaminyltransferase (GalNAc-T) family of enzymes. GalNAc-Ts initiate mucin-type O-linked glycosylation in the Golgi apparatus by catalyzing the transfer of GalNAc to serine and threonine residues on target proteins. They are characterized by an N-terminal transmembrane domain, a stem region, a lumenal catalytic domain containing a GT1 motif and Gal/GalNAc transferase motif, and a C-terminal ricin/lectin-like domain. GalNAc-Ts have different, but overlapping, substrate specificities and patterns of expression. Transcript variants derived from this gene that utilize alternative polyA signals have been described in the literature.

References

Further reading